Arthur Wilson Thomason (February 12, 1889 – May 2, 1944) was a Major League Baseball outfielder who played for one season. He played in 20 games for the Cleveland Naps during the 1910 season. He was later the player/manager of the Rock Island Islanders of the Mississippi Valley League from 1922 to 1923.

External links

Cleveland Naps players
Major League Baseball outfielders
Bartlesville Boosters players
Topeka Jayhawks players
Omaha Rourkes players
Des Moines Boosters players
Lincoln Links players
Sioux City Indians players
Tulsa Oilers (baseball) players
Huron Packers players
Waterloo Hawks (baseball) players
Rock Island Islanders players
Minor league baseball managers
Baseball players from Missouri
1889 births
1944 deaths